Anatoly Medennikov (born 16 March 1958) is a Soviet speed skater. He competed in two events at the 1980 Winter Olympics.

References

1958 births
Living people
Soviet male speed skaters
Olympic speed skaters of the Soviet Union
Speed skaters at the 1980 Winter Olympics
Sportspeople from Yekaterinburg